Nothing is a 2003 Canadian philosophical comedy-drama film directed by Vincenzo Natali. It stars David Hewlett and Andrew Miller.

Plot
The film tells the story of two good friends and housemates, Andrew, an agoraphobic travel agent, and Dave, a loser who works in an office. Dave is fired from his job after his girlfriend frames him for embezzlement, Andrew is falsely accused of attempted child molestation, and their house is to be demolished by day's end. Both of them hide inside the house as police, city officials, and outraged neighbors surround it.  Dave and Andrew open their front door and discover that the entire world beyond their house is gone, replaced with a featureless white void.

Eventually, after a simple test reveals that the nothingness surrounding them holds a flat, featureless, and somewhat springy surface "like tofu", they set out across the empty plane in order to explore their new surroundings, leaving items behind as a means of getting back.  After running out of items to leave as a trail, they lose track of their path.  Wandering leads them to what appears to be another house, but they have simply wandered back home.

Panic begins to set in again when Andrew realizes that the house is completely out of food.  Andrew glances around the room, eventually stopping and glaring at a noisy clock on the wall; within a few seconds it disappears. Andrew drops a stack of overdue bills in front of Dave, and within seconds the bills abruptly disappear - they realize the clock, the bills, and the entire outside world have all disappeared because they were objects of their hate, and that concentrating their hate on things somehow makes them disappear. Dave puts the theory to test, managing to hate away his need for food.

Dave still expresses some concern over Andrew's remaining phobias, questioning why the phobias still exist when there is nothing left to fear.  Reluctantly, Andrew reveals that he was abused and tormented by his parents as a child.  With some urging from Dave he hates away the memory of each traumatic childhood event as he recounts it; when he is finally done he is no longer phobic and much more confident in himself.  Unfortunately this change alters Andrew's personality and leads to friction between the two friends, finally building into an outright confrontation.  They decide they can no longer share the same house, and opt to determine who keeps it by playing a match of their favorite fighting game.  Dave loses, and is exiled with his possessions to reside out in the nothingness.

Things become very tense with Dave's departure.  Dave attempts to engage Andrew in conversation repeatedly, even performing the national anthem for his self-created nation (its borders marked by a line of his possessions), all to no avail.  After several days Dave comes into Andrew's house much happier and explains his sudden change of mood: he has hated away his anger at Andrew; all Andrew needs to do is hate away his anger at Dave and things will be back to normal.  Andrew refuses, quite content to be angry at Dave.  Dave hates away his anger several times as Andrew rebuffs and outright insults him, but his patience finally wears thin, leading Dave to hate away one of Andrew's possessions.  Andrew retaliates by hating away one of Dave's possessions, and the situation escalates until everything including the house is hated away.

Dave walks away, assuming the argument is finished, but falls over suddenly as his feet begin to disappear; Andrew is hating them away.  He turns and retaliates, hating away Andrew's legs, and the situation escalates again until all that is left of the two are their disembodied heads.  Refusing to give up the fight, Andrew and Dave manage to turn themselves and (by bouncing) charge at each other, headbutting each other repeatedly until they finally stop, exhausted.  Their anger abated, Dave and Andrew make up, agree to be best friends again, and set off to explore the nothingness.  As they bounce away into the white void they remark how they both had always thought that their bodies were somehow holding them back.

In a post-credits scene, an obviously older Dave and Andrew – still disembodied heads – are sleeping when they are awakened by a popping sound, followed by a loud clamoring of voices and noise.  As the unseen source of the clamoring gets louder and closer the two scream.

Cast
 David Hewlett as Dave 
 Andrew Miller as Andrew 
 Gordon Pinsent as Man In Suit 
 Marie-Josée Croze as Sara 
 Andrew Lowery as Crawford 
 Elana Shilling as Little Girl 
 Soo Garay as Little Girl's Mother 
 Martin Roach as Co-worker 
 Angelo Tsarouchas as Foreman 
 Rick Parker as Mounted Police Officer 
 Maurice Dean Wint as Narrator
 Bobby the Turtle as Stan

Production

In an interview with Troy Riser of The Trades, director Vincenzo Natali described Nothing as "an experimental film" and called it "the comic flipside" of his earlier Cube. According to Natali, Cube and Nothing are the first two installments of "an informal trilogy of minimalist films," the third of which will be Echo Beach.

Natali, who considers Nothing "a story about friendship" at its core, originally envisioned Stan the turtle as the film's narrator. Due to budget constraints, however, the idea of a talking turtle could not be realized. Natali also associated Stan with a metaphorical significance: "He's a turtle because that's what David and Andrew are -- creatures who carry their home on their back and hide from the world."

In an email interview with Patrick Douglas of The Culture Shock, Natali attributed his desire to make Nothing to a fascination with the "notion of editing reality." He explained the decision to keep the leading actors' real names in the script as "Creative bankruptcy."

David Hewlett, Andrew Miller and Natali grew up and went to high school together. In an interview with Ian Caddell of The Georgia Straight, Natali recalled how Hewlett and Miller had to enact many of the scenes in Nothing hanging from the ceiling on wires. But, he said, they enjoyed the abuse because they knew it could be the last opportunity the three would have to work together. In an interview with Jason Anderson of Eye Weekly, Hewlett, describing the suspension apparatus as a 30-foot atomic wedgie, commented, "[Natali]'d hang us from the ceiling like puppets and literally place us where he wanted us." Miller spoke of similar hardships: "It was really ridiculous."

Natali credited colleague Terry Gilliam as an influence to whom Nothing owes "a real debt."

The film features Squigglevision-like scenes produced by Head Gear Animation.

Reception
Rotten Tomatoes, a review aggregator, reports that 50% of six surveyed critics gave the film a positive review; the average rating is 6/10.

Film critic Dan Schneider called Nothing "not a bad film", but "not good either", remarking that "its essential silliness and triviality are what keep this from reaching the existential level of a good The Twilight Zone episode, or something more akin to George Lucas's THX 1138." Schneider also criticized the soundtrack, arguing that "the film would have been much more effective if the music had suggested darker undertones." He concluded his review saying, "Nothing is one of those films that will stick with a viewer for a while, if only because it will leave scenarios open to be reworked in each viewer's mind."

References

External links
 
 

2003 films
2000s mystery comedy-drama films
2000s psychological drama films
2000s science fiction comedy-drama films
Canadian mystery comedy-drama films
Canadian science fiction comedy-drama films
English-language Canadian films
Films set in Toronto
Films directed by Vincenzo Natali
Films scored by Michael Andrews
Films with screenplays by Vincenzo Natali
2000s English-language films
2000s Canadian films
Copperheart Entertainment films